The fungal genus Pyrenophora includes 191 species, including the following plant pathogenic species: P. teres, P. graminea and P. tritici-repentis.

P. teres  (teleomorph Drechslera teres) makes up to 3 conidia per conidiophore. It infects plants with an appressorium. It grows biotrophically in the first infected plant cell, but then switches to a necrotrophic growth mode. During necrotrophic growth the fungus can only be found in the plant apoplast but not within plant cells.

References

 
Fungal plant pathogens and diseases
Pleosporaceae